William "Good Lance" Eagle Shirt was a Native American actor, performer, and screenwriter who was born and raised on the Great Plains of South Dakota. He appeared in a string of Hollywood films in the 1910s and is credited with co-writing two of them.

Biography 
William and his family — all Oglala Sioux — were forced to settle on the Pine Ridge Reservation, where he met and married a woman named Mattie; the pair had a daughter named Bessie. After performing in Wild West shows, he began appearing in silent films. At some point, he remarried a woman named Emma; the pair divorced in 1942 with no children.

Selected filmography 

 The Conqueror (1917)
 The Silent Lie (1917)
 The Last Ghost Dance (1914)
 The Arrow Maker's Daughter (1914)
 His Squaw (1912)
 The Invaders (1912)
 Custer's Last Fight (1912)
 The Outcast (1912)
 The Lieutenant's Last Fight (1912)
 The Battle of the Red Men (1912) (also writer)
 The Heart of an Indian (1912)
 War on the Plains (1912) (also writer)

References 

Native American actors
Actors from South Dakota
1873 births
Year of death missing